La Cumparsita Rock 72 is an Argentinian rock band formed in Villa Elvira, La Plata, Argentina in 2001.

Discography

Studio albums

Todo en la estacion (2004) 
 Mi Solucion
 Circunvalacion
 Timba nacional
 Femenina de placer
 Peleando la soledad
 Una vez mas
 Nena
 ¿Que pasa?
 Solo en una noche
 Una de esas cosas no me iba 
 La 72

El Misterio de lo sencillo (2010) 
 Un barco en el charco
 A lo lejos
 Reggae fumon
 Puede que haya mas
 Perdimos el tiempo
 Tierra del arte
 Sinceridad
 El surco
 Vicente
 Otoño amanecer
 La negra matonga
 Circunvalacion (Bonus Track - hidden pregap before track 1)

Live albums 
 Vivo en Atenas (2006)

See also
 Argentine rock

References

External links
 
 
 Blog about rock bands from La Plata
 
 Fotolog with pictures of live shows and posters
 Lyrics from La Cumparsita Rock 72

Argentine rock music groups
Rock en Español music groups
Musical groups established in 2001